New York Rocker was a punk rock new wave magazine founded by Alan Betrock in 1976. In 1979, it had a circulation of 20,000. Betrock left the magazine in 1978, and Andy Schwartz took over as editor until 1982. The same year the magazine was closed. It published a total of 54 issues during its lifetime.

Ira Kaplan, guitarist and singer for Yo La Tengo, was a critic for the magazine. The dB's wrote and recorded the song, "I Read New York Rocker" in tribute to the magazine and recorded several demos in the magazine's offices.

See also
Punk

References

External links

Andy Schwartz's NY Rocker blog

Music magazines published in the United States
Defunct magazines published in the United States
Magazines established in 1976
Magazines disestablished in 1982
New wave music
Punk mass media
Magazines published in New York City